Meltonby is a hamlet in the civil parish of Yapham, in the East Riding of Yorkshire, England. In the Imperial Gazetteer of England and Wales of 1870-72 it had a population of 66.

Meltonby is listed in the Domesday Book as in the Hundred of Warter in the East Riding of Yorkshire. At the time of the survey the settlement contained thirteen villagers. five smallholders, four tributaries (rent payers), fifteen burgesses, a priest and a church. There were fifty-three ploughlands, woodland, and three mills. In 1066 Earl Morcar held the lordship, which in 1086 transferred to King William I, who was also Tenant-in-chief.

In 1823 Meltonby was in the parish of Pocklington, and the Wapentake of Harthill. Population at the time was 78, with occupations including six farmers & yeomen.

References

External links

Villages in the East Riding of Yorkshire